|}

The Rosemary Stakes is a Listed flat horse race in Great Britain open to mares and fillies aged three years or older.
It is run at Newmarket over a distance of 1 mile (1,609 metres), and it is scheduled to take place each year in September.

The race was inaugurated in 1991, and was run at Ascot as a Listed Handicap until 2010.

Winners

See also
 Horse racing in Great Britain
 List of British flat horse races

References
Racing Post: 

Flat races in Great Britain
Newmarket Racecourse
Mile category horse races for fillies and mares
Recurring sporting events established in 1991
1991 establishments in England